The 1969 Grand National was the 123rd renewal of the Grand National horse race that took place at Aintree Racecourse near Liverpool, England, on 29 March 1969. Twelve-year-old Highland Wedding, running in his third Grand National, was the winner by 12 lengths. He was ridden by jockey Eddie Harty Sr. for trainer Toby Balding. The favourite was Red Alligator who fell at the 19th fence (open ditch).

Finishing order

Non-finishers

Media coverage

David Coleman presented Grand National Grandstand: this would be the first National televised in colour. Peter O'Sullevan, Julian Wilson (first National commentary), Michael O'Hehir and Michael Seth-Smith provided the commentary. This would be the final television commentary on the National for both O'Hehir and Seth-Smith; however, both would continue as Grand National commentators for BBC radio until the mid-1980s. O'Hehir wrongly called Highland Wedding a faller at the second Becher's Brook (fence 22), this mistake cruelly cutting short his televised National commentaries.

References

Sources

https://news.google.com/newspapers?id=s2EhAAAAIBAJ&sjid=bIcFAAAAIBAJ&pg=4177%2C5966920

 1969
Grand National
Grand National
20th century in Lancashire
March 1969 sports events in the United Kingdom